Waidhofen an der Thaya (Czech: Český Bejdov) is an Austrian town located on the German Thaya river in the district of the same name in Lower Austria. It is the northernmost of the capitals of the Districts of Austria.

Population

Twin cities 
 Heubach, Germany since 1982
 Telč, Czech Republic since 1992

Personalities
 Birgit Zotz, writer and anthropologist
 Alexander Wurz, racing driver

References

External links 

Cities and towns in Waidhofen an der Thaya District